Morbakka is a genus of box jellyfish in the Carukiidae family.

Species
The World Register of Marine Species lists the following two species:
Morbakka fenneri  Gershwin, 2008 
Morbakka virulenta  (Kishinouyea, 1910)

References

Carukiidae
Medusozoa genera